In anatomy, the ulnar veins are venae comitantes for the ulnar artery.  They mostly drain the medial aspect of the forearm.  They arise in the hand and terminate when they join the radial veins to form the brachial veins.

They follow the same course as the ulnar artery.

Additional Images

External links
 

Veins of the upper limb